Stafa may refer to:

Places 
 Staffa, an island of the Inner Hebrides in Argyll and Bute, Scotland
 Stäffa, also known as Stäfa, a municipality in the district of Meilen in the canton of Zürich in Switzerland.
 Staffa, Ontario,  a municipality in Ontario, Canada, situated in Western Perth County, just west of the city of Stratford

People 
 Dino Staffa (1906–1977), Italian Cardinal of the Roman Catholic Church
 Giuseppe Staffa (1807–1877), Italian composer and conductor

Buildings 
 San Giovannino della Staffa, Siena, an Italian Renaissance style, Roman Catholic church